Sierra de Luna is a municipality located in the province of Zaragoza, Aragon, Spain. According to the 2004 census (INE), the municipality has a population of 269 inhabitants.

References

External links
 Photography de Sierra de Luna

Municipalities in the Province of Zaragoza